Vicinothrips is a monotypic genus of thrips in the family Phlaeothripidae.

Species
 Vicinothrips bullatus

References

Phlaeothripidae
Thrips
Thrips genera
Monotypic insect genera